is the seventh in the Time Bokan series.

Plot
The story begins in the year 20XX. Oshaka School in Kamakuland is a world-renowned school where only those who are pure and clearheaded descendants of Priest Sanzo's clan may be admitted. The trio of villains firmly believe they are genuine descendants of Priest Sanzo's clan, although they are of uncertain lineage. They study hard to enter the school in spite of their repeated failure. One day, three intelligent children are called in by the principal and asked to find a set of missing copper plates scattered all over the world. The plates are to be used to complete a puzzle board, which will bring honor to the Oshaka School. The conversation is overheard by the trio of villain, and they decide to stop the youngsters.

The show was cancelled after twenty episodes due to low audience ratings.
The show's title is a play on the Japanese saying "Itadakimasu," said before beginning a meal.

Cast

Itadakiman
Kusaku Magota/Itadakiman – Mayumi Tanaka

Oshaka University
Headmaster Ochaka – Hirō Oikawa
Kanno-sensei – Yuri Nashiwa
Oshakan-tori – Kei Tomiyama

Tatemae Trio
Houko Sanzo – Hiromi Oikawa
Shago Jo – Bin Shimada
Chō Hakko – Tomohiro Nishimura

Dirt Cheap Trio
Yan-Yan – Noriko Ohara
Dasainen – Jōji Yanami
Tonmentan – Kazuya Tatekabe
Ryuko – Chika Sakamoto

Other
Narrator – Kei Tomiyama

Episode list

References

External links
 
逆転イッパツマン｜タイムボカンシリーズDVDコレクション

1983 anime television series debuts
Fuji TV original programming
Science fiction anime and manga
Tatsunoko Production
Time Bokan Series
Transforming heroes